Leucopogon audax is a species of flowering plant in the heath family Ericaceae and is endemic to a restricted area of the south-west of Western Australia. It is an erect, open, single-stemmed shrub with hairy branchlets, egg-shaped leaves and white flowers sometimes tinged with pink, in groups in upper leaf axils or on the ends of branches.

Description
The upper surface of the leaves is concave, both surfaces usually densely hairy.

Taxonomy and naming
Leucopogon audax was first formally described in 2014 by Michael Clyde Hislop in the journal Nuytsia from specimens he collected east of  Pingelly in 2010. The specific epithet (audax) means "bold", referring to the habit of the plant and its large flowers.

Distribution and habitat
This leucopogon mainly grows in heath or open woodland in a restricted area in the Brookton-Pingelly in the Avon Wheatbelt biogeographic region of south-western Western Australia.

Conservation status
Leucopogon audax is classified as "Priority Two" by the Western Australian Government Department of Biodiversity, Conservation and Attractions, meaning that it is poorly known and from only one or a few locations.

References

audax
Ericales of Australia
Flora of Western Australia
Plants described in 2014